The Stroller Strategy is a 2013 French comedy film directed by Clément Michel. The musical score was composed by Sylvain Ohrel. The film starring Raphaël Personnaz and Charlotte Le Bon in the lead roles.

Cast
 Raphaël Personnaz : Thomas Platz
 Charlotte Le Bon : Marie Deville 
 Jérôme Commandeur : Paul Bordinot
 Camélia Jordana : Mélanie
 Julie Ferrier : Valérie
 Baltazar Rizzo : Felipe
 François Berléand : Jean-Luc Hamory
 François Rollin : Franck Del Rio
 Anne Charrier : Lorraine
 Yelle : Flore
 Guilaine Londez : The nurse
 François Civil : François

References

External links
 
 

2012 films
French comedy films
2010s French-language films
2012 comedy films
Films shot in France
2010s French films